The Pârâul Nou (also: Șomartin) is a right tributary of the river Olt in Romania. It discharges into the Olt in Nou Român.

References

Rivers of Romania
Rivers of Sibiu County
Rivers of Brașov County